Mong Nai Township is a township of Langkho District in the Shan State of Myanmar. The main town is Mong Nai. It is an ancient city. The primary agricultural products of the area are rice and sugar.

References

Townships of Shan State